Donawad is a village in Belgaum district in the southern state of Karnataka, India.

This village is about 15 km away from the Taluka headquarters Chikodi.

This small village has about 1500 population. The population is scattered in agricultural land.

This village has many temples, among them the Lord Kalmeshawara temple, Shri Durgadevi and Shri Elumakkal thayi temples are famous. Devotees visit all the temples from various part.

This small village is very famous for its education and this small village has about 45 Law degree holders.

The main occupation of this village is agriculture. Farmers grow sugar cane as a major crop and around four sugar factories are situated within a range of 40 km.

References

Villages in Belagavi district